Omar Niño Romero (born 12 May 1976) is a Mexican former professional boxer who competed from 1995 to 2016. He held the WBC light flyweight title in 2010.

Professional career
Known as "Giant Killer", he is the former WBC Light Flyweight Champion, defeating Brian Viloria in a major upset in August 2006 for the title. In his next fight, Niño Romero fought Viloria in a rematch to a majority draw decision and a retention of his title on November 18, 2006 in Las Vegas, Nevada. The win was marred with controversy, as Niño allegedly tested positive for methamphetamine in his post-fight urinalysis following the bout with Viloria. Ultimately, he was stripped of his title in February 2007, and suspended for nine months and fined by the Nevada State Athletic Commission the following month.

He fought Rodel Mayol on February 27, 2010, in Mayol's first defense of the WBC light flyweight title at the Coliseo Olimpico de la UG in Guadalajara, Jalisco, Mexico. The bout ended with a controversial technical draw after three rounds.  Despite being knocked down and out, Mayol was able to retain his WBC junior flyweight title.  Mayol was hit by Romero with some "low blows.” and followed these punches with a punch to the head.  According to writer Dong Secuya, the referee was going to stop the bout in the 3rd round when Romero fired a hard left that hit the jaw of the momentarily defenseless Mayol who went down almost without consciousness.

See also 
List of WBC world champions
List of Mexican boxing world champions

References

External links 
 

1976 births
Doping cases in boxing
Mexican sportspeople in doping cases
Light-flyweight boxers
Living people
Boxers from Jalisco
Sportspeople from Guadalajara, Jalisco
World Boxing Council champions
World light-flyweight boxing champions
World boxing champions
Mexican male boxers